"The Golden Age of Rock 'n' Roll" is a single by Mott the Hoople, written by Ian Hunter. It is a release from 1974's The Hoople.

Background
Performed live by Mott, "The Golden Age of Rock 'n' Roll" would usually follow a piano take on the first verse of Don McLean's "American Pie", hence following the latter's statement, "The day the music died". Ian Hunter would declare: "Or did it? Ladies and gentlemen, The Golden Age of Rock 'n' Roll!", whereupon the whole band launched into the song. This can be heard among the 2006 bonus tracks on The Hoople and on the Broadway disc of the 2004 remastered and expanded 30th Anniversary Edition of Live.

Reception
Cash Box called it a "hard driving rocker typical of the great work the group has been turning out of late" that is "highlighted by the strength of Hunter’s vocals and a strong keyboard and lead guitar." Record World said "Horn lines from Larry Williams' 'Boney Maroney' wedded to Mott's brand of glitter rock means a hit marriage of the past and the future of rock."

Chart performance
It reached number 16 on the UK Singles Chart.
In the US, "The Golden Age of Rock 'n' Roll " went to number 96, and was one three Mott the Hoople releases to hit the Hot 100. In Canada, it reached number 64.

Cover versions
Def Leppard covered the song for their 2006 covers album Yeah!. "The one I assumed I'd breeze through was 'The Golden Age of Rock 'n' Roll'," observed singer Joe Elliott, "which I know backwards, inside out and in foreign languages. We had to take that one down a key because I just couldn't do it."

References

Mott the Hoople songs
1974 singles
Songs written by Ian Hunter (singer)
1974 songs
CBS Records singles